Lindsay Davenport was the defending champion but lost in the final 6–3, 6–4 against Martina Hingis.

Seeds
A champion seed is indicated in bold text while text in italics indicates the round in which that seed was eliminated. The top eight seeds received a bye to the second round.

  Martina Hingis (champion)
  Lindsay Davenport (final)
  Steffi Graf (semifinals)
  Amanda Coetzer (third round)
  Conchita Martínez (quarterfinals)
  Irina Spîrlea (third round)
  Nathalie Tauziat (second round)
  Venus Williams (semifinals)
  Sandrine Testud (third round)
  Dominique Van Roost (third round)
  Ai Sugiyama (third round)
  Sabine Appelmans (withdrew)
  Ruxandra Dragomir (third round)
  Brenda Schultz-McCarthy (first round)
  Natasha Zvereva (quarterfinals)
  Anna Kournikova (third round)
  Joannette Kruger (quarterfinals)

Draw

Finals

Top half

Section 1

Section 2

Bottom half

Section 3

Section 4

Qualifying

Seeds

Qualifiers

Lucky losers

Qualifying draw

First qualifier

Second qualifier

Third qualifier

Fourth qualifier

Fifth qualifier

Sixth qualifier

Seventh qualifier

Eighth qualifier

References
 1998 State Farm Evert Cup Draw
 WTA draw archive

Singles
1998 Newsweek Champions Cup and the State Farm Evert Cup